These hits topped the Dutch Top 40 in 1983.

See also
1983 in music

References

1983 in the Netherlands
1983 record charts
1983